Diamondback Energy is a company engaged in hydrocarbon exploration  headquartered in Midland, Texas.

As of December 31, 2020, the company had  of estimated proved reserves, of which 52% was petroleum, 24% was natural gas, and 24% was natural gas liquids. The company's reserves are all in the Permian Basin.

It is ranked 479st on the Fortune 500.

History
The company began operations in December 2007 with the acquisition of 4,174 net acres in the Permian Basin.

In October 2012, the company became a public company via an initial public offering, issuing 12,500,000 shares of common stock at a price of $17.50 per share.

In March 2017, the company acquired assets from Brigham Resources for $2.55 billion.

In October 2018, the company acquired the assets of Ajax Resources for $1.25 billion.

In November 2018, the company acquired Energen.

In February 2021, the company acquired leasehold interests and assets from Guidon Resources for $375 million in cash and 10.68 million shares.

In March 2021, the company acquired QEP Resources.

References

External links
 

2007 establishments in Texas
2012 initial public offerings
American companies established in 2007
Companies based in Texas
Natural gas companies of the United States
Oil companies of the United States